The SNCF Class BB 67400 diesel locomotives were built by Brissonneau and Lotz between 1969–1975. The final development of the BB 67000 class, they can be found working all over France on both freight and passenger trains.

Names
5 members of the class received names, chiefly of French communes, towns and cities.

References

67400
67400
B′B′ locomotives
Diesel-electric locomotives of France
Railway locomotives introduced in 1969
Standard gauge locomotives of France